A Short History of the Future a 1989 book by the American historian W. Warren Wagar.

A Short History of the Future may also refer to: 

 A book by the British journalist John Langdon-Davies (1936)
 The book A Brief History of the Future: Origins of the Internet by the Irish academic and journalist John Naughton (2000)
 The book A Short History of the Future: Surviving the 2030 Spike by the Australian journalist Colin Mason (2006)